Potato carboxypeptidase inhibitor (PCI) is a naturally occurring protease inhibitor peptide in potatoes that can form complexes with several metallo-carboxypeptidases, inhibiting them in a strong competitive way with a Ki in the nanomolar range. PCI consists of 39 amino acids (MW 4295 Da) forming a 27-residue globular core stabilized by three disulfide bridges and a C-terminal tail with residues 35–39. PCI contains a small cysteine-rich module, called a T-knot scaffold, that is shared by several different protein families, including the EGF family.

Medicinal properties
Because of the structural similarities with EGF, PCI inhibits tumor cell growth. Mechanism of action is inhibition of receptor dimerization and receptor trans-autophosphorylation induced by epidermal growth factor (EGF). PCI blocks the formation and activation of ErbB1/ErbB-2 (EGFR and HER2) heterodimers that have a prominent role in carcinoma development.PCI also inhibits transforming growth factor alpha (TGF-alpha).
In addition for pancreatic enzymes carboxypeptidase A and B, PCI also inhibits carboxypeptidase R without affecting the activity of carboxypeptidase N in the circulation and have therefore use in thrombolytic therapy (blood clot lysis).

References

Further reading

See also
Scaffold (disambiguation)
Protein kinase
Chemotherapy
Thrombolysis
Cancer research

Protease inhibitors